Atlético Mancha Real is a Spanish football team based in Mancha Real in the autonomous community of Andalusia. Founded in 1984, the club competes in Segunda Federación – Group 5, holding home games at Estadio Polideportivo Municipal de La Juventud, with a capacity of 1,500 people.

History 
The notarial document about official foundation of Atlético Mancha Real as a sports association was signed on 4 August 1984. 

Atlético Mancha Real won its Tercera División group in 2009–10, losing the play-off to CD Badajoz. In doing so, it qualified for the Copa del Rey for the first time, losing 4–1 at AD Ceuta in the opening round.

On 29 May 2016, the club promoted to Segunda División B for the first time, with a 5–1 aggregate win over Zamora CF in the play-off. The following season ended with relegation.

Season to season

1 season in Segunda División B
2 seasons in Segunda Federación
16 seasons in Tercera División

References

External links
Official website 
Futbolme team profile 
La futbolteca team profile 

Football clubs in Andalusia
Association football clubs established in 1984
1984 establishments in Spain
Province of Jaén (Spain)